Microphysogobio anudarini is a species of cyprinid fish endemic to the upper Amur drainage in Mongolia and China.

Named in honor of the Mongolian ichthyologist Anudarin Dashidorzhi.

References

Microphysogobio
Fish described in 1969